The Engine House No. 6 in Wichita, Kansas, at 1300 S. Broadway, was built in 1909.  It was listed on the National Register of Historic Places in 1995.

It is a two-story concrete brick building,  in plan, with Tudor Revival-esque features.

It was operational until 1953 when a replacement was built.

References

Fire stations on the National Register of Historic Places in Kansas
National Register of Historic Places in Sedgwick County, Kansas
Tudor Revival architecture in the United States
Fire stations completed in 1909
1909 establishments in Kansas
National Register of Historic Places in Wichita, Kansas